"Xnoybis" is a song by the industrial metal band Godflesh, taken from the album Selfless (1994). It was released in 1995 through Earache Records as a CD, and was also distributed as a promotional to radio stations.

The song
Godflesh frontman Justin Broadrick explained that "Xnoybis" is a song about spiritual transcendence, and that much of the rest of the album carries that theme. Musically, the song features a pummeling drum machine loop and a simple, harmonics-based guitar riff that repeats throughout. Uncharacteristically for Godflesh, the song also has piano in it. "Xnoybis" was one of AllMusic critic Ned Raggett's favourite songs off of Selfless.

While the psychofuckdub of "Xnoybis" also appears on the "Crush My Soul" single, and the original version appears on the album Selfless, the clubdub and edit versions are unique to this release. In 1994, Broadrick called the eighteen-minute psychofuckdub remix "the most experimental thing Godflesh has ever done".

Track listing

Personnel
Godflesh
G.C. Green – bass guitar, production
J.K. Broadrick – guitar, vocals, production
Machines – rhythm, samples

Additional personnel
Bob Ludwig – mastering
Jim Welch – editing (1)
Vlado Meller – editing (1)

References

External links
 

1995 songs
1995 singles
Columbia Records singles
Godflesh songs